48 Hours to Live is a 1959 film starring Anthony Steel.

It was known as Man in the Middle and was shot in Sweden. The movie was little seen outside Sweden.

Premise
A New York reporter, Mike Gibson, is sent to a Swedish island, Gotland, to interview a nuclear scientist. He discovers that foreign agents have kidnapped the scientist and his daughter.

Cast
Anthony Steel as Mike Gibson
Birger Malmsten as Paul Forsman
Lewis Charles as Tony Marino
Håkan Westergren as Christenson
Ina Anders as Annika
Peter Bourne as Charlie Carlson 
Ingemar Johansson

Production
Filming started June 1959.

Reception
The Monthly Film Bulletin said "a fair amount of work in Swedish outdoor settings and a repetitive but catchy theme tune provide this ingenious comedy thriller with two tiny virtues. Otherwise the heavy handled rough stuff is funnier than the light relief; both the characterisation and the acting leave much to be desired; and – a novel departure for a film made in Sweden –  the pursuit of a spy ring leads through a nudist camp inhabited, it seems, but not a single nudist."

References

External links
 
48 Hours to Live at Letterbox DVD

English-language Swedish films
1950s English-language films
1950s Swedish films